Adi Negev, formerly named Aleh Negev, is a rehabilitation village for disabled children and adults in southern Israel. Located near Ofakim and covering , it falls under the jurisdiction of Merhavim Regional Council.

History
The 40-acre village is a multifaceted facility designed specifically for people over the age of 21 who are physically or mentally impaired, and for children seeking care in Southern Israel.

Adi Negev is home to around 150 residents and provides services to 12,000 outpatients. The village provides residential, educational, medical and employment services, and opportunities for social interaction. It was founded by the Aleh organization. The village is also called Nahalat Eran after Eran Almog, the severely autistic son of Major General Doron Almog. Eran Almog lived in the village until his death from Castleman's disease.

The village was built by the Aleh organization, which was founded by Doron Almog. Ground was broken by Prime Minister Ariel Sharon on 12 June 2003.

References

External links
Adi Negev Adi

Villages in Israel
Medical and health organizations based in Israel
Populated places established in 2003
Populated places in Southern District (Israel)